Jamtara district is one of the twenty-four districts of Jharkhand state in eastern India. Jamtara town is the administrative headquarters of this district. The district is situated between 23°10′ and 24°05′ north latitudes and 86°30′ and 87°15′ east longitudes.

Economy
In 2006 the Indian government named Jamtara one of the country's 250 most backward districts (out of a total of 640). It is one of the 21 districts in Jharkhand currently receiving funds from the Backward Regions Grant Fund Programme (BRGF).

Politics 

 |}

Administration

Blocks/Mandals 

Jamtara district consists of 06 Blocks. The following are the list of the Blocks inJamtara district:

Divisions 
There are three Vidhan Sabha constituencies in the district: Nala, Jamtara and Sarath (shared with Deoghar district). All three constituencies are part of Dumka Lok Sabha constituency.

Demographics
According to the 2011 census Jamtara district has a population of 791,042, roughly equal to the nation of Comoros or the US state of South Dakota. This gives it a ranking of 486th in India (out of a total of 640).
Its population growth rate over the decade 2001-2011 was 21%. Jamtara has a sex ratio of 959 females for every 1000 males, and a literacy rate of 63.73%. Scheduled Castes and Scheduled Tribes make up 9.21% and 30.40% of the population respectively.

69.6% are Hindu, 20.78% Muslim, and 8.67% Sarna.

At the time of the 2011 Census of India, 30.18% of the population spoke Bengali, 29.10% Santali, 27.93% Khortha, 5.92% Hindi and 3.61% Urdu as their first language.

See also
 Districts of Jharkhand

References

External links
 Jamtara district website

 
Districts of Jharkhand
2001 establishments in Jharkhand